Opladen, now a district of Leverkusen, used to be the capital of the Rhein-Wupper-Kreis (Rhine-Wupper-District) until 1975. It is also on the Autobahn A3. Population (1905) was 6338, (1975) 42,000. It has several Evangelical and Roman Catholic churches. It used to have dyeing works, manufactures of dynamite, indigo products, publishing companies and a railway plant. Before passing to Prussia, Opladen belonged to the duchy of Berg.

References

External links
 Opladen.eu 
 AGO Stadtteilmarketing Opladen 

Towns in North Rhine-Westphalia
Leverkusen